Congosto de Valdavia is a municipality located in the province of Palencia, Castile and León, Spain. According to the 2004 census (INE), the municipality has a population of 239 inhabitants.

History 
One hamlet of this municipality whose name is Cornoncillo, has been related by several people with the military campaign of Augustus against the Cantabri.

Another hamlet of the municipality, Villanueva de Abajo, had its origin in a repopulation of the 10th century. A cemetery of the Low Middle Ages, a necropolis has been discovered in the locality.

Main sights 
These are most notable buildings following historic and architectural criteria:

 Congosto de Valdavia Parish Church
 San Roque Shrine
 Small Sanctuary Nuestra Señora del Otero

Festivities 
These are the main festivities of the municipality:

 Romeria Virgen del Otero Church: a festivity which is held beside that church.
 Nuestra Señora: This festivity is held on 15 August.
 San Roque: It is held of 16 August.

References

External links
Official website

Municipalities in the Province of Palencia